Garra orientalis is a species of cyprinid fish in the genus Garra which is found in the Pearl River system of China.

References 

orientalis
Cyprinid fish of Asia
Freshwater fish of China
Fish described in 1925